In the twelfth-century Danish history Gesta Danorum (The Deeds of the Danes), Siward, (Sywardus, Synardus), was an ancient king in Götaland, who had a daughter named Alfhild, who became a legendary Viking pirate.

To protect his daughter from unworthy suitors, Siward had her chamber guarded by a lizard and a snake. He also said that if any man tried to enter it, and failed, his head was to be taken off and impaled on a stake. 

When Alf, a Danish prince, managed to defeat the animal guards, Siward told him that he would only accept "that man for his daughter's husband, of whom she made a free and decided choice". At first, Alfhild said no and ran away from home, but, after some adventures with her Viking fleet, she met Alf in a sea combat, and, after losing the battle, decided to marry him.

Siward also had two sons, Wemund and Osten.

In popular culture
The name Synardus seems to be a medieval or modern invention. In the original Latin text of Gesta Danorum, it is rendered Siwardus and Sywardus. In Danish, it is Sivard.

See also
 Alf and Alfhild
 Yngwin
 Awilda

References

External sources
 Gesta Danorum, book 7.
 Gesta Danorum in Latin
 Another version of Gesta Danorum (in Danish)

Kings of the Geats
Mythological kings of Sweden